Manslaughter is a common law legal term for homicide considered by law as less culpable than murder. The distinction between murder and manslaughter is sometimes said to have first been made by the ancient Athenian lawmaker Draco in the 7th century BC.

The definition of manslaughter differs among legal jurisdictions.

Types

Voluntary

For voluntary manslaughter, the offender had intent to kill or seriously harm, but acted "in the moment" under circumstances that could cause a reasonable person to become emotionally or mentally disturbed.  There are mitigating circumstances that reduce culpability, such as when the defendant kills only with an intent to cause serious bodily harm. Voluntary manslaughter in some jurisdictions is a lesser included offense of murder. The traditional mitigating factor was provocation; however, others have been added in various jurisdictions.

The most common type of voluntary manslaughter occurs when a defendant is provoked to commit homicide. This is sometimes described as a crime of passion. In most cases, the provocation must induce rage or anger in the defendant, although some cases have held that fright, terror, or desperation will suffice.

Assisted suicide

Assisted suicide is suicide committed with the aid of another person, sometimes a physician.

In some places, including parts of the United States, assisted suicide is punishable as manslaughter. 
In other countries such as Switzerland and Canada, and in some U.S. states, as long as legal safeguards are observed, assisted suicide is legal.

Involuntary
Involuntary manslaughter is the killing of a human being without intent of doing so, either expressed or implied. It is distinguished from voluntary manslaughter by the absence of intention. It is normally divided into two categories, constructive manslaughter and criminally negligent manslaughter, both of which involve criminal liability.

Constructive
Constructive manslaughter is also referred to as "unlawful act" manslaughter. It is based on the doctrine of constructive malice, whereby the malicious intent inherent in the commission of a crime is considered to apply to the consequences of that crime. It occurs when someone kills, without intent, in the course of committing an unlawful act. The malice involved in the crime is transferred to the killing, resulting in a charge of manslaughter.

For example, a person who fails to stop at a red traffic light while driving a vehicle and hits someone crossing the street could be found to intend or be reckless as to assault or criminal damage (see DPP v Newbury). There is no intent to kill, and a resulting death would not be considered murder, but would be considered involuntary manslaughter. The accused's responsibility for causing death is constructed from the fault in committing what might have been a minor criminal act. Reckless driving or reckless handling of a potentially lethal weapon may result in a death that is deemed manslaughter. The DPP v Newbury case had redefined the meaning of murder in the Australian constitution, and reformed in order to include a mens rea assessment.

Involuntary manslaughter may be distinguished from accidental death. A person who is driving carefully, but whose car nevertheless hits a child darting out into the street, has not committed manslaughter. A person who pushes off an aggressive drunk, who then falls and dies, has probably not committed manslaughter, although in some jurisdictions it may depend whether "excessive force" was used or other factors.

As manslaughter is not defined by legislation in Australia, common law decisions provide the basis for determining whether an act resulting in death amounts to manslaughter by unlawful and dangerous act. To be found guilty of manslaughter by an unlawful and dangerous act, the accused must be shown to have committed an unlawful act which is contrary to the criminal law, and that a reasonable person in the position of the accused would have known that by their act, they were exposing the victim to an "appreciable risk of serious injury".

Criminally negligent

Criminally negligent manslaughter is variously referred to as criminally negligent homicide in the United States, and gross negligence manslaughter in England and Wales. In Scotland and some Commonwealth of Nations jurisdictions the offence of culpable homicide might apply.

It occurs where death results from serious negligence, or, in some jurisdictions, serious recklessness. A high degree of negligence is required to warrant criminal liability. A related concept is that of willful blindness, which is where a defendant intentionally puts themselves in a position where they will be unaware of facts which would render them liable.

Criminally negligent manslaughter occurs where there is an omission to act when there is a duty to do so, or a failure to perform a duty owed, which leads to a death. The existence of the duty is essential because the law does not impose criminal liability for a failure to act unless a specific duty is owed to the victim. It is most common in the case of professionals who are grossly negligent in the course of their employment. An example is where a doctor fails to notice a patient's oxygen supply has disconnected and the patient dies (R v Adomako and R v Perreau). Another example could be leaving a child locked in a car on a hot day.

Vehicular and intoxicated
In some jurisdictions, such as some U.S. States, there exists the specific crime of vehicular or intoxication manslaughter.  An equivalent in Canada is causing death by criminal negligence  under the Criminal Code, punishable by a maximum penalty of life imprisonment.

On the mens rea, or state of mind, or the circumstances under which the killing occurred (mitigating factors), manslaughter is usually broken down into two distinct categories: voluntary manslaughter and involuntary manslaughter.  However, this is not the case in all jurisdictions, for example, in the U.S. state of Florida.

In some jurisdictions, such as the U.K., Canada, and some Australian states, "adequate provocation" may be a partial defense to a charge of murder, which, if accepted by the jury, would convert what might otherwise have been a murder charge into manslaughter.

National standards

Australia
In Australia, specifically New South Wales, manslaughter is referred to, however not defined, in the Crimes Act 1900 (NSW).

Manslaughter exists in two forms in New South Wales: Voluntary or Involuntary Manslaughter. In New South Wales, in cases of voluntary manslaughter, both the actus reus (literally guilty act) and mens rea (literally guilty mind) for murder are proven but the defendant has a partial defence, such as extreme provocation or diminished responsibility. In cases of involuntary manslaughter, the actus reus for murder is present but there is insufficient mens rea to establish such a charge.

There are two categories of involuntary manslaughter at common law: manslaughter by unlawful and dangerous act and manslaughter by criminal negligence. The authority for the actus reus and mens rea of involuntary manslaughter by an unlawful and dangerous act is the High Court of Australia case of Wilson v R. This case determined that the act that caused the death must breach the criminal law and that the act must carry an appreciable risk of serious injury (actus reus). Regarding the mens rea, the court held that the accused must intend to commit the unlawful act and that a reasonable person in the position of the accused would have realised or recognised that the act carried an appreciable risk of serious injury. Manslaughter by criminal negligence, on the other hand, finds its authority in the Victorian case of Nydam v R, confirmed by the High Court of Australia in R v Lavender and Burns v R. In Nydam v R, the Court described the office at [445] in the following terms:In order to establish manslaughter by criminal negligence, it is sufficient if the prosecution shows that the act which caused the death was done by the accused consciously and voluntarily, without any intention of causing death or grievous bodily harm but in circumstances which involved such a great falling short of the standard of care which a reasonable man would have exercised and which involved such a high risk that death or grievous bodily harm would follow that the doing of the act merited criminal punishment.

Canada
Canadian law distinguishes between justifiable, accidental and culpable homicide. If a death is deemed a culpable homicide, it generally falls under one of four categories (first-degree murder, second-degree murder, manslaughter, and infanticide).

Canadian law defines manslaughter as "a homicide committed without the intention to cause death, although there may have been an intention to cause harm". There are two broad categories of manslaughter: unlawful act, and criminal negligence.

Unlawful act is when a person commits a crime that unintentionally results in the death of another person.

Criminal negligence is when the homicide was the result of an act that showed wanton or reckless disregard for the lives of others.

England and Wales

In English law, manslaughter is a less serious offence than murder. In England and Wales, the usual practice is to prefer a charge of murder, with the judge or defence able to introduce manslaughter as an option (see lesser included offence). The jury then decides whether the defendant is guilty or not guilty of either murder or manslaughter. Manslaughter may be either voluntary or involuntary, depending on whether the accused has the required  for murder.

The Homicide Act 1957  and Coroners and Justice Act 2009 are relevant acts.

Voluntary manslaughter occurs when the defendant avails themself of two statutory defences described in the Homicide Act 1957 (diminished responsibility and a suicide pact; provocation was a third but this was replaced by loss of control in 2010).

Involuntary manslaughter occurs when the agent has no intention of committing murder but caused the death of another through recklessness or criminal negligence. The crime of involuntary manslaughter can be sub-divided into two main categories; constructive manslaughter and gross negligence manslaughter.

United States

Manslaughter is a crime in the United States. Definitions can vary among jurisdictions, but the U.S. follows the general principle that manslaughter involves causing the death of another person in a manner less culpable than murder, and observes the distinction between voluntary and involuntary manslaughter.

Civil law
Some civil law jurisdictions, such as the French Code, use "murder" or "involuntary homicide" to cover the crime of manslaughter, and reserve "assassination" for the crime of premeditated murder.

Historical distinction from murder 
A legal distinction between intentional and unintentional homicide was introduced in Athenian law in 409 BC, when the legal code of Draco indicated that intentional homicide (hekousios phonos or phonos ek pronoias) was punishable by death. The language is ambiguous as to unintentional homicide (akousios phonos), but it may have been punishable by exile. However, academic David D Phillips says that these categories "do not correspond to the common-law categories of murder and manslaughter either in their original significance or in their present definitions", because under Athenian law intentional homicide would include both murder and voluntary manslaughter.

Anglo-Saxon law recognised particular degrees of homicide, with the worst being forsteall (killing by ambush). Murdra was a separate type of aggravated (secret) homicide under Anglo-Saxon law; William the Conqueror defined it narrowly as a fine that would be charged on a hundred following the slaying of a foreigner (originally a Norman, but intermarriage would end the distinction between Normans and English by the 13th century). By 1348, the association between murdrum and malice aforethought emerged.

"Manslaughter" as a general term for homicide was in use in medieval England by the late 1200s, during which time a distinction was forming between homicide committed in necessary self-defence (pardoned without culpability) and homicide committed by accident (pardoned but with moral blame). From 1390, homicide in necessary self-defence or by misadventure became "pardons of course", meaning that the Chancery would issue them by default. Homicide in necessary self-defence would later be acquitted, rather than pardoned. The use of "manslaughter" to cover homicides other than murder emerged by 1547, in a statute. Edward Coke confirms this distinction in The Third Part of the Institutes of the Laws of England, which remains "the authoritative starting point for any examination of the law of homicide" in the United Kingdom and other common law countries.

See also
 Culpable homicide
 Criminal transmission of HIV
 Depraved-heart murder
 Imperfect self-defense
 Twinkie defense

References

External links

Killings by type
 
Homicide
Criminal law